Holographis is a genus of flowering plants belonging to the family Acanthaceae.

Its native range is Mexico.

Species:

Holographis anisophylla 
Holographis argyrea 
Holographis caput-medusae 
Holographis ehrenbergiana 
Holographis hintonii 
Holographis ilicifolia 
Holographis leticiana 
Holographis lizethae 
Holographis pallida 
Holographis parayana 
Holographis peloria 
Holographis pueblensis 
Holographis tamaulipica 
Holographis tolantongensis 
Holographis velutifolia 
Holographis virgata 
Holographis websteri

References

Acanthaceae
Acanthaceae genera